Gciriku or Dciriku (Also Diriku, Dirico, Manyo or Rumanyo), is a Bantu language spoken by 305,000 people along the Okavango River in Namibia, Botswana and Angola. 24,000 people speak Gciriku in Angola, according to Ethnologue. It was first known in the west via the Vagciriku, who had migrated from the main Vamanyo area and spoke Rugciriku, a dialect of Rumanyo. The name Gciriku (Dciriku, Diriku) remains common in the literature, but within Namibia the name Rumanyo has been revived. The Mbogedu dialect is extinct; Maho (2009) lists it as a distinct language, and notes that the names 'Manyo' and 'Rumanyo' are inappropriate for it.

These clicks, of which there are half a dozen (c, gc, ch, and prenasalized nc and nch), are generally all pronounced with a dental articulation, but there is broad variation between speakers. They are especially common in place names and in words for features of the landscape, reflecting their sources in Khwe and Ju, two members of the Khoisan language family. Many of the click words in Gciriku, including those in native Bantu vocabulary, are shared with Kwangali, Mbukushu, and Fwe.

References

External links
 Gciriku vocabulary

Kavango languages
Languages of Angola
Languages of Botswana
Languages of Namibia
Click languages